Foreign relations of Portugal are linked with its historical role as a major player in the Age of Discovery and the holder of the now defunct Portuguese Empire. Portugal is a European Union member country and a founding member of NATO. It is a committed proponent of European integration and transatlantic relations. João Gomes Cravinho is the current Minister of Foreign Affairs of Portugal.

Historical
Historically, the focus of Portuguese diplomacy has been to preserve its independence, vis-à-vis, the danger of annexation by Spain, and the maintenance of the Anglo-Portuguese Alliance, which officially came into being in 1386, and with the United Kingdom as a successor to England, it is still in place today.

Other goals have also been constant such as the political stability of the Iberian peninsula and the affirmation of Portuguese interests in Europe and the Atlantic (also in the Indian and Pacific Oceans throughout different moments in history).

International organizations

Portugal was a founding member of NATO (1949), Organisation for Economic Co-operation and Development (1961), and European Free Trade Area (1960); it left the latter in 1986 to join the European Economic Community, which would become the European Union (EU) in 1993. In 1996, it co-founded the Community of Portuguese Language Countries (CPLP). The country is a member state of the United Nations since 1955.

Recently, the primacy of the United States and inter-governmental organizations such as NATO and the United Nations have also been paramount in the affirmation of Portugal abroad.

Portugal has been a significant beneficiary of the EU. It was among the top beneficiaries of the EU-15 between 1995 and 2004 (only behind Spain and Greece in absolute terms, and behind Ireland and Greece in a per capita basis). Portugal is a proponent of European integration and held the presidency of the European Union for the second time during the first half of 2000, and again in the second half of 2007. Portugal used its term to launch a dialogue between the EU and Africa and to begin to take steps to make the European economy dynamic and competitive. In 2002, the euro began to circulate as Portugal's currency. José Sócrates, as Prime Minister of Portugal, presided over the rotative Presidency of the Council of the European Union for the period July–December 2007. In this post, Sócrates and his team focused on the EU-Brazil (1st EU-Brazil summit) and EU-African Union (2007 Africa-EU Summit) relations, as well as in the approval of the Treaty of Lisbon.

Portugal was a founding member of NATO; it is an active member of the alliance by, for example, contributing proportionally large contingents in Balkan peacekeeping forces. Portugal proposed the creation of the Community of Portuguese Language Countries (CPLP) to improve its ties with other Portuguese-speaking countries. Additionally, Portugal has participated, along with Spain, in a series of Ibero-American Summit. Portugal held the chairmanship of the Organization for Security and Co-operation in Europe (OSCE) for the year 2002. The chairman-in-office was Portuguese Foreign Minister António Martins da Cruz.

Disputes
Portugal holds claim to the disputed territory of Olivença on the Portugal-Spain border.

International visits 

 List of international prime ministerial trips made by António Costa

Diplomatic relations 
Portugal maintains diplomatic relations with all United Nations members except Bhutan and moreover maintains diplomatic relations with the Cook Islands, Holy See, Kosovo and the Sovereign Military Order of Malta.

Bilateral relationships

Africa

Americas

Asia

Europe

Oceania

See also
 List of diplomatic missions in Portugal
 List of diplomatic missions of Portugal

References